Sultan Mahmud Power Station or Kenyir Dam (Malay: Empangan Kenyir) is the hydroelectric dam which forms Kenyir Lake, Terengganu, Malaysia. It is located 50 km southwest of Kuala Terengganu on the Kenyir River. The project is a multipurpose hydroelectric power and flood mitigation scheme.

History
The Kenyir River was first identified for hydroelectric potential in 1961 but it proved uneconomical due to low energy demand and high cost of construction. Years later in 1972 the Malaysian government revived the study and further site investigations were proceeded.

Construction started in 1978 and was completed in 1985. In 1987 the dam was officially opened by Sultan Mahmud Al-Muktafi Billah Shah the Sultan of Terengganu. The dam's power station was named after the Sultan as the "Sultan Mahmud Hydro Electric Power Station". The station is operated by Tenaga Nasional Berhad.

Kenyir dam technical specifications
The power station is a hydroelectric power station, using four turbines of 100 megawatt each. Continuous power output is 165 MW. Average annual energy output is 1,600 GWh.

The dam is 150 m in height above foundation, with a crest length of 800 m, and the dam fill volume is 15.20 million cubic metres. Crest elevation is 155 m above sea level (ASL) while maximum flood level is 153 m. The maximum operating level is 145 m and a minimum of 120 m. The reservoir surface area at 145 m ASL is 370 km², and with a catchment area of 2,600 km². Storage capacity is 13,600 million cubic metres.

In case of overflow during monsoon seasons there is a spillway that is ungated/free flow, with a maximum capacity of 7,000 cubic metres per second. Water flows through four penstocks into four turbines turning four air-cooled electric generators rated at 100 megawatt each.

See also
Tenaga Nasional Berhad

References

External links

 TNB webpage 

Hydroelectric power stations in Malaysia
Dams in Malaysia
Dams completed in 1985

de:Kenyir-Talsperre